Michael ( 1042–1058) was a Byzantine patrikios, magistros and doux of the Theme of Dyrrhachium. He was sent in 1042 by Emperor Constantine IX to attack the Serbian rebel Stefan Vojislav, but was defeated. In 1048, he was the doux of Paristrion. George Cedrenus later mentions magistros Michael, patrikios Theodore Chryselios and patrikios Christopher Pyrrhos as supporting Patriarch Michael Keroularios in his dispute with Emperor Isaac I Komnenos (1058). He was the son of logothetes Anastasios.

References

Sources

11th-century Byzantine military personnel
Byzantine generals
Byzantine governors of Dyrrhachium
Patricii
Magistroi